Swithinbank Slope is a semi-circular ice slope, about 25 nautical miles (46 km) long, between Mount Hallgren and Newmayer Cliffs in the Kirwan Escarpment of Queen Maud Land. Mapped by Norwegian cartographers from surveys and air photos by Norwegian-British-Swedish Antarctic Expedition (NBSAE) (1949–52) and air photos by the Norwegian expedition (1958–59). Named for Charles W. Swithinbank, glaciologist with NBSAE.

See also
Skarvhalsen Saddle

Ice slopes of Queen Maud Land
Princess Martha Coast